The Miles Baronetcy, of Leigh Court in the County of Somerset, is a title in the Baronetage of the United Kingdom. It was created on 19 April 1859 for the banker and Conservative politician William Miles. His son, the second Baronet, was also a banker and Conservative politician.   The family's bank, founded in 1750, eventually became part of NatWest.

Philip John Miles, father of the first Baronet, was Mayor of Bristol and sat as member of parliament for Westbury, Corfe Castle and Bristol. The first Baronet was an uncle of Philip Napier Miles, Frank Miles and Christopher Oswald Miles.

Miles baronets, of Leigh Court (1859) 
Sir William Miles, 1st Baronet (1797–1878)
Sir Philip John William Miles, 2nd Baronet (1825–1888)
Sir Cecil Miles, 3rd Baronet (1873–1898)
Sir Henry Robert William Miles, 4th Baronet (1843–1915)
Sir Charles William Miles, OBE, 5th Baronet (1883–1966)
Sir William Napier Maurice Miles, 6th Baronet (1913–2010)
Sir Philip John Miles, 7th Baronet (born 1953).

Currently, the baronetcy is considered Vacant as the presumed 7th baronet has either not laid claim to the title or it has not yet been processed by the Standing Council of the Baronetage.

References

Kidd, Charles, Williamson, David (editors). Debrett's Peerage and Baronetage (1990 edition). New York: St Martin's Press, 1990.

Miles
English landowners
Banking families